The 2022 Supercopa do Brasil (officially the Supercopa Kia 2022 for sponsorship reasons) was the fifth edition of Supercopa do Brasil, an annual football match played between the champions of the Campeonato Brasileiro Série A and Copa do Brasil.

The match was played on 20 February 2022 between Atlético Mineiro, winners of the 2021 Campeonato Brasileiro Série A and the 2021 Copa do Brasil and Flamengo, runners-up of the 2021 Campeonato Brasileiro Série A.

On 26 January 2022, the Federação de Futebol do Distrito Federal announced that the match would be hosted at Arena BRB Mané Garrincha in Brasília, however one day later the Governo do Distrito Federal banned fans from venues in the state following the spread of the COVID-19. Due to this inconvenience, on 8 February 2022, CBF decided to move the match to Arena Pantanal in Cuiabá.

Tied 2–2, Atlético Mineiro won 8–7 on penalties to win their first title in the tournament.

Qualified teams

Match

Details

References 

Supercopa do Brasil
2022 in Brazilian football
CR Flamengo matches
Clube Atlético Mineiro matches
February 2022 sports events in South America
Supercopa do Brasil 2022